John Rutter's Requiem is a musical setting of parts of the Latin Requiem with added psalms and biblical verses in English, completed in 1985. It is scored for soprano, mixed choir and orchestra or chamber ensemble.

Five of its seven movements are based on text from the Latin Requiem Mass, while the second movement is a setting of "Out of the deep" (Psalm 130) and the sixth movement is an anthem The Lord is my Shepherd (Psalm 23) which Rutter had earlier written. The first movement combines the Introit and Kyrie, the third is Pie Jesu, with soprano solo. The central movement is a lively  Sanctus, followed by Agnus Dei and finally Lux aeterna. In the Agnus Dei and Lux aeterna, Rutter combines the liturgical Latin text with English biblical verses.

Four of the movements of the Requiem were first performed at Fremont Presbyterian Church, Sacramento, California, on 14 March 1985. The first performance of the complete work was at Lovers' Lane United Methodist Church, Dallas, Texas, on 13 October 1985. It was published in 1986 by Oxford University Press.

History 
Rutter completed his Requiem in 1985. It bears the dedication "in memoriam L. F. R.", John Rutter's father, who had died the previous year.

He conducted the first performance on 13 October 1985 at Lovers' Lane United Methodist Church, Dallas, Texas, where the director of Music Allen Pote prepared the Sanctuary Choir and orchestra. The soprano soloist was Karen Shafer. Movements 1, 2, 4, and 7 had been performed on 14 March 1985 at Fremont Presbyterian Church, Sacramento, California, by the Sanctuary Choir and ensemble, prepared by Mel Olson and also conducted by the composer.

The Requiem was published in 1986 by Oxford University Press, with a singable English text also for the Latin passages.

Music 
Rutter scored the Requiem for mixed choir and orchestra. It features solos for cello, soprano and oboe. He prepared two versions, one for a chamber ensemble and one for orchestra. The ensemble consists of flute, oboe, timpani, glockenspiel, harp, cello and organ, while the orchestra has 2 flutes, oboe, 2 clarinets, bassoon, 2 horns, timpani, glockenspiel, harp and strings.
 
Rutter structured the work in seven movements, similar to the setting of Gabriel Fauré. One of the movements is The Lord is my Shepherd, which he had written as an anthem in 1976.

Table of movements 
The following table shows the title, Tempo marking, voices, time, key and text sources for the seven movements. The information is given for the beginning of the movements. Rutter frequently shifts tempo, key and time. The source for the details is the vocal score, unless otherwise noted.

1 
The first movement consists of the Introit from the Requiem ("Requiem aeternam") and the Kyrie. The work opens with a steady beat of the tympani, to which instruments enter, first without a defined key. The voices enter in measure 7, stating in unison on the note C "Requiem aeternam". The text beginning "Kyrie eleison" is set in G major.

2 
The second movement is entitled Out of the Deep, the English version of Psalm 130, a psalm commonly used at Anglican funerals. It is set in C minor and begins with an expanded cello solo. Its motifs are picked up by the voices, first alto and bass in unison, in low register.

3 
The third movement is the Pie Jesu, a text that concludes the sequence Dies irae. Rutter, as before him Fauré and Duruflé, omit the sequence, but include the prayer to Jesus for rest. It begins with a soprano soloist singing with a very light accompaniment, with only slight involvement of the chorus echoing the words "Dona eis requiem, Dona eis sempiternam requiem".

4 
The central movement is the Sanctus (with Benedictus), a lively, and exclamatory movement which is brightly orchestrated with bells, flute, and oboe and occasional timpani recalling the passage in Old Testament scripture in Isaiah chapter 6, and the worship of the six-winged seraphim in the heavenly throne-room of God.

5 
The fifth movement is the Agnus Dei (Lamb of God) of the Requiem. Rutter uses a steady beat on one note, similar to the timpani of the first movement. The Latin text is contrasted with another biblical passage, "Man that is born of a woman hath but a short time to live" from the Book of Job. The call Agnus Dei in measure 58 is the dynamic climax of the Requiem. After an instrumental interlude which quotes a melody associated with Easter, the voices sing very softly "I am the resurrection and the life", from the Book of John.

6 
The sixth movement is Psalm 23, another psalm commonly used at Anglican funerals. It mentions the valley of the shadow of death, but is an expression of trust in God and hope for dwelling in his house forever.

7 
The seventh movement includes words from the 1662 Book of Common Prayer Burial Service ("I heard a voice from heaven...") and the communion chant from Requiem (Lux aeterna).

The work lasts about 40 minutes.

References

Bibliography

Further reading

External links 
 Requiem, recording with St. Matthew's Choir and orchestra of Ealing
 Tarik O'Regan: John Rutter (b. 1945) / Requiem and other sacred music (Liner notes) Naxos 8.557130 (2003)
 Louise Luegner: Requiem (program notes) Collegium Records

Compositions by John Rutter
Psalm settings
1985 compositions
Rutter